beatmania, referred as beatmania European Edit in the game's credits, is a music game for the PlayStation by Konami. It was released in the European market in 2000 and was sold in combination with the beatmania Controller.

Controller

The beatmania Controller for PlayStation by Konami (Sony ID: SLEH-00021, Konami product no. RU024) is used with the music video game beatmania. It features a keyboard with five keys and a turntable-like platter. The controller and game disc were also sold as a bundle.

References

2000 video games
Beatmania games
PlayStation (console)-only games
Europe-exclusive video games
PlayStation (console) games
Video games developed in Japan

Multiplayer and single-player video games